Brody Lovett is a fictional character on the ABC soap opera One Life to Live, portrayed by Mark Lawson from April 24, 2008, to January 13, 2012 when the series ended.

Storylines
Brody is a former Navy SEAL brought to Llanview by Adriana Cramer to distract Gigi Morasco from Adriana's fiancé Rex Balsom. A hardened veteran of the war in Iraq, Brody had been "stop-lossed" several times during his tours of duty.

Gigi establishes in 2007 that Brody, the father of her son Shane, had died heroically overseas while she had still been pregnant. Threatened by Gigi's connection to her high school sweetheart Rex, Adriana sends her mother Dorian Lord to get information on the deceased Brody in 2008. Meeting Brody's sister Nadine, Dorian discovers that Brody is in fact alive; disapproving of the match, Brody's mother had told Gigi he had died, and had told Brody that Gigi had moved on to another man. Further, Adriana's suspicions that Gigi had already been pregnant when she had met Brody — and that Rex is most likely Shane's father — are confirmed.  She is even more discouraged to discover that Brody and Gigi's relationship was platonic, despite Brody's willingness to give her son a name and his hopes of building a family with Gigi.

Adriana hopes Brody can distract Gigi from Rex and help keep the secret of Shane's paternity from coming out, which she fears will cement Gigi and Rex forever and doom Adriana's relationship with him. Traumatized by his experiences in the Iraq War and embittered by what he believes was Gigi's abandonment of him, Brody still has feelings for Gigi, but is hesitant to disrupt her life. Convinced by Adriana that Gigi and Shane need him, Brody finally makes his presence known to a shocked Gigi and elated Shane at Rex and Adriana's wedding.

With Rex married to Adriana, Gigi and Brody keep up the pretense that Brody is Shane's father; Gigi feels as though she has no choice but to allow Brody back into her life, as she is unwilling to disrupt Rex's marriage or crush her son's hopes and dreams of finally knowing his "father."  Brody hopes to pursue a real relationship with Gigi, but she is soon wrapped up again with Rex, who separates from Adriana after discovering her machinations. Meanwhile, Brody focuses his attentions and affection on Shane, to whom he grows very close, thinking of the boy as "his son" in every respect. Brody sees in Shane an opportunity for a new start, and takes the initiative to find employment and begin attending Alcoholics Anonymous meetings. When Gigi leaves town to pursue the missing Rex to Texas, a jealous Brody takes charge of Shane and the household. Having grown dependent on Shane's love and validation, Brody fears that if Gigi and Rex are to reunite, he will lose access to the most important person in his life. When local psychic Madame Delphina cryptically warns Brody that Gigi and Rex may be "gone for good," Brody panics, fearing that Social Services will put Shane into the foster care system if he is unable to assert paternity. Brody uses Rex's DNA from a toothbrush to fake a paternity test which "proves" Brody to be Shane's father and therefore, his legal guardian in Gigi's absence. Brody's hopes are dashed, however, when Gigi and Rex return to Llanview together, Rex knowing the truth about Shane's paternity and the couple ready to tell Shane.

Despondent, Brody suffers a mental breakdown, trashing Gigi's house and accidentally injuring her friend Marcie McBain. Lapsing into "combat mode," Brody outmaneuvers Gigi and Rex by picking up Shane from school and taking him to Llantano Mountain. Once there, a delusional and armed Brody dons his old combat fatigues and begins to tell Shane about his experiences in Iraq. Losing track of reality, Brody suffers vivid hallucinations from his tours of duty, including the image of an Iraqi boy he had accidentally killed during a raid. Brody is cornered by the Llanview Police Department, accompanied by Gigi and Rex; initially, Brody uses Shane as a human shield, but soon declares he could never hurt "his son" and sends the boy to his mother. Police Commissioner Bo Buchanan, a former Vietnam vet, tries to talk Brody down, but an unstable Brody fires wildly, accidentally shooting Rex. Brody is arrested and taken into custody, where his condition worsens due to his severe case of posttraumatic stress disorder. Now aware of Brody's deep trauma stemming from his war experiences, a recovered Rex decides not to press charges, and a stabilized Brody is admitted to St Ann's sanitarium for treatment.

At St. Ann's, Brody befriends Jessica Buchanan, who is recovering from her latest bout of dissociative identity disorder following the death of her husband Nash Brennan. Realizing his conflicting memories of the encounter in which he had shot the Iraqi boy, Brody learns that the boy had not been armed as he had been led to believe; a fellow soldier had put a gun in the child's hand to protect Brody. This realization helps Brody recover and secure his release, and he eventually begins a romantic relationship with Jessica. Brody helps Jessica through a relapse of her illness and the stillborn birth of Nash's baby and becomes a Llanview Police officer.

Jessica's evil biological father Mitch Laurence returns and subjects her to electroshock therapy; she loses all memory beyond her senior year of high school. Believing she is still in love with her high school boyfriend Cristian Vega, Jessica repeatedly rejects Brody. May 21, 2010 a drunk and dejected Brody sleeps with Jessica's sister Natalie; Jessica regains her memory the same night while being seduced by Robert Ford. Brody and Natalie decide to keep their encounter a secret from both Jessica and Natalie's boyfriend John McBain. Natalie and Jessica both discover that they are pregnant; Brody assumes he is the father of Jessica's baby, but she keeps the secret that it may be Ford. Natalie is also fearful that Brody is her baby's father rather than John, and she confesses as much to a shocked Brody. On July 29, 2010 Brody proposes, and Jessica accepts. Brody is later furious to discover he may not be the father of her baby, but he and Jessica reconcile. Paternity tests declare Brody the father of both children, but Natalie never tells him that. She tells him her test says John is the babies father, which in reality it is, since the paternity results were changed by accident by Clint's assistant.

In January 2011, Jessica gives birth to her baby by C-section. They later name the baby Ryder Asa Lovett. Both of Brody's "sons" are born on the same day. On Brody/Jessica's and John/Natalie's double wedding, the truth about both babies fathers are revealed and Tess comes back. Natalie and Brody grow closer and become a couple. On June 30, 2011 Brody finds out he is not Liam's father. On July 21, 2011, Brody finds Vimal's letter on John's desk and goes to find him at "The Sun" to warn him to keep his mouth closed. Marty, Victor, Vimal, Jack and Brody are the only ones who know the truth about baby Liam's paternity.

In September 2011, Brody proposed to Natalie and she accepts. It is also revealed that John is still in love with Natalie, but he hasn't told her yet. Brody and Natalie's wedding doesn't go as planned when Natalie finds out that John is Liam's father and Brody has known for months. During the week of November 14, Brody goes off the deep end after losing Natalie and Liam, which causes him to kidnap Liam and hold Natalie and John at gun point. After thinking it over, Brody tearfully gives Liam back to his parents. On December 1, 2011, Brody is last seen having a conversation with Jessica in St. Ann's. The two vow to remain friends and stay in touch. Jessica says goodbye to Brody and tearfully leaves him behind.

During the series finale on January 13, 2012, Brody returns to Llanfair and informs Jessica that he has been released from St. Ann's. He also apologizes for the death of Ford and tells her that he has been offered another job in the Navy. She tells him to take care of himself. He tells her that if there is anything that she needs, he will be there for her. Even though things were rough between them, he will always care for her. She says that she really appreciates it, and with that Brody leaves town.

References

Television characters introduced in 2008
One Life to Live characters
Fictional United States Navy SEALs personnel
Fictional American police officers
Fictional Iraq War veterans